This list of mountains and hills of Baden-Württemberg shows a selection of mountains, hills and high points in the German state of Baden-Württemberg, sorted by height in metres (m) above sea level (NHN).

Highest mountains, hills and high points in Baden-Württemberg’s regions 
The following table shows the highest mountain, hill or high point in each of the natural regions or landscapes of Baden-Württemberg.

In the landscape column, large-scale or high Central Uplands are shown in bold, italics are used to indicate landscapes or local areas of upland or valleys, sometimes dominated by just an isolated hill. Clicking on the word “List” in the “Lists” column leads to an article that describes or lists other mountains and hills in that landscape or region; these may include elements that lie outside Baden-Württemberg.

The table is initially sorted by height, but can be rearranged by other criteria. Clicking on the symbol in a particular column will sort the table by the entries in that column.

Mountains and hills in the state of Baden-Württemberg 
Name, Height, Location (Settlement, county/counties, region)
 Feldberg (1,493.0 m),  Breisgau-Hochschwarzwald, Black Forest
 Seebuck (1,448.2 m),  Breisgau-Hochschwarzwald, Black Forest
 Herzogenhorn (1,415.2 m),  Waldshut, Black Forest
 Belchen (1,414.0 m), Lörrach/Breisgau-Hochschwarzwald, Black Forest
 Stübenwasen (1,386.0 m), Todtnauberg,  Lörrach, Black Forest
 Silberberg (1,358 m), Todtnau-Brandenberg,  Lörrach, Black Forest
 Spießhorn (1,348.9 m), Bernau,  Waldshut, Black Forest
 Toter Mann (1,320.7 m), Oberried,  Breisgau-Hochschwarzwald, Black Forest
 Blößling (1,309.6 m), Bernau,  Waldshut, Black Forest
 Bärhalde (1,317 m), Feldberg-Neuglashütten/Menzenschwand, Breisgau-Hochschwarzwald/Waldshut, Black Forest
 Zweiseenblick (1,305 m), Feldberg-Neuglashütten,  Breisgau-Hochschwarzwald, Black Forest
 Schnepfhalde (1,299 m), Schluchsee/Menzenschwand, Breisgau-Hochschwarzwald/Waldshut, Black Forest
 Schauinsland (1,284.4 m), Freiburg im Breisgau/ Breisgau-Hochschwarzwald, Black Forest
 Trubelsmattkopf (1,281.4 m), Muggenbrunn,  Lörrach, Black Forest
 Habsberg (1,274 m), Schluchsee,  Breisgau-Hochschwarzwald, Black Forest
 Wieswaldkopf (1,278 m), Hinterzarten,  Breisgau-Hochschwarzwald, Black Forest
 Hochkopf (1,263.4 m), Todtmoos/Präg,  Waldshut, Black Forest
 Kandel (1,241.4 m),  Emmendingen/ Breisgau-Hochschwarzwald, Black Forest
 Köhlgarten (1,224 m), Neuenweg/Wies,  Lörrach, Black Forest
 Farnberg (1,218.0 m), Todtmoos/Bernau/Ibach,  Waldshut, Black Forest
 Bötzberg (1,209 m), St. Blasien,  Waldshut, Black Forest
 Windeck (1,209 m), Hinterzarten,  Breisgau-Hochschwarzwald, Black Forest
 Sengalenkopf (1,208 m), Todtnau-Gschwend,  Lörrach, Black Forest
 Hochgscheid (1,207 m), Fröhnd,  Lörrach, Southern Black Forest
 Hinterwaldkopf (1,198.2 m),  Breisgau-Hochschwarzwald, Black Forest
 Hochfirst (1,190.1 m), Titisee-Neustadt/Lenzkirch,  Breisgau-Hochschwarzwald, Black Forest
 Weißtannenhöhe (1,190 m), Breitnau/Titisee-Neustadt,  Breisgau-Hochschwarzwald, Black Forest
 Hörnle (Münstertal) (1,187 m), near Münstertal/Wieden, Breisgau-Hochschwarzwald/Lörrach, Black Forest
 Obereck (1,176.6 m), Simonswald,  Emmendingen, Black Forest
 Griesbacher Eck (1,172 m), Simonswald,  Emmendingen, Black Forest
 Rohrenkopf (1,170 m),  Lörrach, Black Forest
 Blauen (auch Hochblauen) (1,165 m), Breisgau-Hochschwarzwald/Lörrach, Black Forest
 Hornisgrinde (1,164 m), Ortenaukreis, Black Forest
 Roßeck (1,154 m), Simonswald,  Emmendingen, Black Forest
 Rohrhardsberg (1,152 m), Black Forest-Baar-Kreis, Black Forest
 Brend (1,148 m), Black Forest-Baar-Kreis/ Emmendingen, Black Forest
 Steinberg (1,141 m), Neukirch, Black Forest-Baar-Kreis, Black Forest
 Bossenbühl (1,127 m), Waldau,  Breisgau-Hochschwarzwald, Black Forest
 Hornkopf (1,121 m), Simonswald,  Emmendingen, Black Forest
 Schwarzer Grat (1,118.0 m),  Ravensburg, Adelegg
 Sirnitz (1,114 m), Münstertal/Badenweiler,  Breisgau-Hochschwarzwald, Black Forest
 Tafelbühl (1,084 m), Simonswald,  Emmendingen, Black Forest
 Altsteigerskopf (1,082 m), Ortenaukreis, Black Forest
 Hundsrücken (1,080 m), near the Hornisgrinde, Ortenaukreis, Black Forest
 Zeller Blauen (heute seltener Hochblauen) (1,077 m),  Lörrach, Black Forest
 Stöcklewald (1,068.2 m), Black Forest-Baar-Kreis, Black Forest
 Hasenhorn (1,058 m),  Lörrach, Black Forest
 Vogelskopf (1,056 m),  Freudenstadt und Ortenaukreis, Black Forest
 Schliffkopf (1,055 m),  Freudenstadt, Black Forest
 Hoher Ochsenkopf (1,054 m),  Rastatt, Black Forest
 Seekopf (1,054 m), Ortenaukreis,  Freudenstadt, Black Forest
 Gschasikopf (1,045 m), Elzach,  Emmendingen, Black Forest
 Hochkopf (1,039 m), Ortenaukreis, Black Forest
 Bubshorn (1,032 m), Fröhnd/Pfaffenberg,  Lörrach, Black Forest
 Honeck (1,022 m), Bürchau,  Lörrach, Black Forest
 Lemberg (1,015.3 m),  Tuttlingen, Swabian Jura
 Pfälzer Kopf (1,013 m), Baiersbronn,  Freudenstadt, Black Forest
 Oberhohenberg (1,011 m), Zollernalbkreis, Swabian Jura
 Hochberg (1,009 m),  Tuttlingen, Swabian Jura
 Mehliskopf (1,009 m),  Rastatt, Black Forest
 Wandbühl (1,007 m),  Tuttlingen, Swabian Jura
 Rainen (1,006 m),  Tuttlingen, Swabian Jura
 Rappeneck (1,006 m),  Breisgau-Hochschwarzwald, Black Forest
 Montschenloch (1,004 m),  Tuttlingen, Swabian Jura
 Wilhelmshöhe (1,003 m), Black Forest-Baar-Kreis, Black Forest
 Badener Höhe (1,002 m), Baden-Baden/ Rastatt, Black Forest
 Bol (1,002 m),  Tuttlingen, Swabian Jura
 Hummelsberg (1,002 m),  Tuttlingen, Swabian Jura
 Plettenberg (1,002 m), Zollernalbkreis, Swabian Jura
 Kehlen (1,001 m), Tuttlingen, Swabian Jura
 Riesenköpfle (1,001 m), Baiersbronn,  Freudenstadt, Black Forest
 Seekopf (1,001 m), near Forbach-Herrenwies,  Rastatt, Black Forest
 Gugel (998 m), near Herrischried,  Waldshut Tiengen, Black Forest
 Ortenberg (995 m),  Tuttlingen, Swabian Jura
 Weichenwang (989 m), Zollernalbkreis, Swabian Jura
 Hohloh (988 m),  Rastatt, Black Forest
 Dreifaltigkeitsberg (983 m),  Tuttlingen, Swabian Jura
 Hohe Möhr (983 m),  Lörrach, Black Forest
 Lupfen (977 m),  Tuttlingen, Swabian Jura
 Alexanderschanze (970 m),  Freudenstadt, Black Forest
 Lochenstein (963 m), Zollernalbkreis, Swabian Jura
 Raichberg (956 m), Zollernalbkreis, Swabian Jura
 Böllat (956 m), Zollernalbkreis, Swabian Jura
 Brandenkopf (945 m), Ortenaukreis, Black Forest
 Hundsrücken (931 m), Zollernalbkreis, Swabian Jura
 Zeller Horn (912 m), Zollernalbkreis, Swabian Jura
 Hohenkarpfen (912 m),  Tuttlingen, Swabian Jura
 Teufelsmühle (908 m),  Rastatt, Black Forest
 Hörnleberg (905.6 m), near Gutach im Breisgau,  Emmendingen, Black Forest
 Kornbühl (886 m), Zollernalbkreis, Swabian Jura
 Hörnle (Bollschweil) (885.8 m), near Bollschweil,  Breisgau-Hochschwarzwald, Black Forest
 Moos (878 m), Ortenaukreis, Black Forest
 Herrenwieser Sattel (878 m), Baden-Baden/ Rastatt, Black Forest
 Römerstein (872 m),  Reutlingen, Swabian Jura
 Roßberg (869 m),  Reutlingen, Swabian Jura
 Neuhewen (863.9 m),  Konstanz, Hegau
 Witthoh (862 m),  Tuttlingen, Höhenzug am Rand der Schwäbischen Alb
 Zoller (855 m), Zollernalbkreis, Swabian Jura
 Sternberg (844 m),  Reutlingen, Swabian Jura
 Hohenhewen (844 m),  Konstanz, Hegau
 Hohenstoffel (844 m),  Konstanz, Hegau
 Höchsten (837.8 m), Bodenseekreis/ Sigmaringen, Linzgau
 Hohe Warte (820 m),  Reutlingen, Swabian Jura
 Boßler (799.7 m),  Göppingen, Swabian Jura
 Wachbühl (791 m),  Ravensburg, Zeiler Schotterfeld
 Farrenkopf (789 m), Ortenaukreis, Black Forest
 Kaltes Feld (781 m), Ostalbkreis, Swabian Jura
 Galgenberg (776.6 m),  Ravensburg, Altdorf Forest
 Teckberg (775 m),  Esslingen, Swabian Jura
 Waldburg (772 m),  Ravensburg, Oberschwaben
 Bussen (767 m),  Biberach, Oberschwaben
 Fuchseck (762 m),  Göppingen, Swabian Jura
 Stuifen (757 m), Ostalbkreis, Swabian Jura
 Gehrenberg (754 m), Bodenseekreis, Linzgau
 Grabener Höhe (754 m),  Ravensburg, Oberschwaben
 Volkmarsberg (743 m), Ostalbkreis, Swabian Jura
 unnamed summit (715.6 m),  Konstanz, Schiener mountain
 Hohbäumle (712 m),  Biberach, Oberschwaben
 Sielenwang (710 m),  Göppingen, Swabian Jura
 Achalm (707.1 m),  Reutlingen, Swabian Jura
 Hörnle, Esslingen/Reutlingen, Swabian Jura
 Rechberg (707 m), Ostalbkreis, Swabian Jura
 unnamed summit (706.5 m),  Ravensburg, Atzenberger Höhe
 unnamed summit (697.9 m),  Ravensburg, Wagenhart
 Bernstein (694 m),  Rastatt/ Calw, Black Forest
 unnamed summit (693.4 m),  Konstanz, Bodanrück
 Brandeckkopf (686 m), Offenburg, Ortenaukreis, Mittlerer Black Forest
 Hohentwiel (686 m),  Konstanz, Hegau
 Hohenstaufen (684 m),  Göppingen, Swabian Jura
 Merkur (668 m), Baden-Baden/ Rastatt, Black Forest
 Ipf (668 m), Ostalbkreis, Swabian Jura
 Mägdeberg (664 m),  Konstanz, Hegau
 Schönberg (644 m),  Breisgau-Hochschwarzwald/Freiburg im Breisgau, Black Forest Foothills
 Hohenkrähen (644 m),  Konstanz, Hegau
 Katzenbuckel (626.0 m), Neckar-Odenwald-Kreis, Odenwald
 Mahlberg (613 m),  Rastatt,  Karlsruhe, Black Forest
 Daumen (611 m),  Calw, Heckengau and Schlehengäu
 Staufen (593 m),  Konstanz, Hegau
 Hohwacht (590 m), Zollernalbkreis, Rammert
 Rangenbergle (589 m),  Reutlingen
 Hohe Brach (586.4 m), Rems-Murr-Kreis, Mainhardt Forest
 Hagberg (585.2 m), Ostalbkreis, Welzheim Forest
 Stiefelhöhe (584 m), Rhein-Neckar-Kreis, Odenwald
 Bromberg (582.6 m),  Böblingen, Schönbuch
 Hornberg (580.0 m) Ostalbkreis, Virngrund
 Battert (568 m), Baden-Baden, Black Forest
 Königstuhl (567.8 m), Rhein-Neckar-Kreis and Stadtkreis Heidelberg, Kleiner Odenwald
 Hohentannen (565.4 m), Ostalbkreis, Frickenhofer Höhe
 Altenberg (564.7 m),  Schwäbisch Hall, Limpurg Hills
 Raitelberg (561.0 m),  Heilbronn, Löwenstein Mountains
 Totenkopf (556.6 m),  Breisgau-Hochschwarzwald, Kaiserstuhl
 Kinzert (554 m), Neckar-Odenwald-Kreis, Odenwald
 Weißer Stein (550 m), Rhein-Neckar-Kreis, Odenwald
 Hohe Warte (548 m), Rhein-Neckar-Kreis, Odenwald
 Friedinger Schlossberg (545.5 m),  Konstanz, Hegau
 Zollstock (543.7), Rems-Murr-Kreis, Murrhardt Forest
 Stocksberg (538.9 m),  Heilbronn, Löwenstein Hills
 Hohe Flum (536.2 m),  Lörrach, Dinkelberg
 Fremersberg (525 m), Baden-Baden,  Rastatt, Black Forest
 Steinknickle (525 m),  Heilbronn, Mainhardt Forest
 Mühlberg (522.8 m), Hohenlohekreis, Waldenburg Hills
 Eichelspitze (521.3 m),  Breisgau-Hochschwarzwald, Kaiserstuhl
 unnamed summit (519.6 m), Rems-Murr-Kreis, Buocher Höhe
 Kernen (513.2 m), Rems-Murr-Kreis, Schurwald
 Bopser (Hoher Hoher; 485.2 m), Stadtkreis Stuttgart, Filder
 Baiselberg (476.6 m),  Ludwigsburg, Stromberg
 Heiligenberg (445 m), Heidelberg, Odenwald
 Maschlanden (417 m), Main-Tauber-Kreis, Bauland
 Württemberg (395 m), Stuttgart, Schurwald
 Wunnenstein (395 m), Ludwigsburg, Baden-Württemberg
 Heidelberg (335.9 m),  Heilbronn, Heuchelberg
 unnamed summit (334 m),  Heilbronn, Hohenlohekreis, Harthausen Forest

References 

Mountains, Baden-Wurttemberg
Baden-Wurttemberg